Tim Scott (born January 25, 1993) is an American football safety who is currently a free agent. He played college football at North Carolina.

Professional career

Dallas Cowboys
Scott signed with the Dallas Cowboys as an undrafted free agent on May 9, 2015. He was waived on September 5, 2015 and was re-signed to the practice squad. He spent time on and off the Cowboys' practice squad throughout the season before being released on December 1, 2015.

Cleveland Browns
On December 8, 2015, Scott was signed to the Cleveland Browns' practice squad. He signed a reserve/future contract with the team on January 5, 2016. He was waived by the Browns on August 30, 2016.

Washington Redskins
On August 3, 2017, Scott was signed by the Washington Redskins. He was waived on August 13, 2017.

New York Giants
On August 24, 2017, Scott was signed by the New York Giants. He was waived on September 1, 2017 and was re-signed to the practice squad. He was promoted to the active roster on November 4, 2017. He was waived on November 7, 2017. He was re-signed to the practice squad on December 12, 2017. He signed a reserve/future contract with the Giants on January 1, 2018. He was waived on May 22, 2018.

Arizona Cardinals
On August 10, 2018, Scott was signed by the Arizona Cardinals to a one year contract. He was waived on September 1, 2018.

References

External links
North Carolina Tar Heels bio

1993 births
Living people
Players of American football from Virginia
Sportspeople from Fredericksburg, Virginia
American football safeties
North Carolina Tar Heels football players
Dallas Cowboys players
Cleveland Browns players
Washington Redskins players
New York Giants players
Arizona Cardinals players